This is a list of consorts of the Kingdom of Majorca.

Queen consort of Majorca

House of Aragon

See also
List of Hispanic consorts
List of Aragonese consorts
Countess of Barcelona
List of consorts of Montpellier
List of Castilian consorts
List of Asturian consorts
List of Leonese consorts
List of Galician consorts
List of Navarrese consorts
List of Spanish consorts
Lady of Balaguer

Notes

Sources

 
Women of medieval Spain
Majorca
Royal consorts
Majorcan consorts